Very Severe Cyclonic Storm Vardah was the fourth cyclonic storm, as well as the most intense tropical cyclone of the 2016 North Indian Ocean cyclone season. The remnants of the system later regenerated into Depression ARB 02 in the Arabian Sea. The system struck the Andaman and Nicobar Islands, as well as South India, before later affecting Somalia.

Originating as a low-pressure area near the Malay Peninsula on 3 December, the storm was designated a depression on 6 December. It gradually intensified into a Deep Depression on the following day, skirting off the Andaman and Nicobar Islands, and intensified into a Cyclonic Storm on 8 December. Weakening into a Severe Cyclonic Storm, Vardah made landfall close to Chennai on the following day, and degenerated into remnant low on 13 December. However, on 14 December, the remnants of Vardah emerged into the Arabian Sea, before regenerating into Depression ARB 02 on 17 December. On 18 December, the system weakened back into a well-marked low while situated off the coast of Somalia, before moving ashore on the next day and dissipating.

The name Vardah, suggested by Pakistan, refers to the red rose.

Meteorological history

Under the influence of a persistent area of convection, a low-pressure area formed over the Malay Peninsula, adjoining north Sumatra, in early December 2016. The low-pressure area gradually organized into a tropical disturbance over the next several days, as it slowly moved towards the southeast Bay of Bengal. Owing to low wind shear and favorable sea surface temperatures, the storm gradually intensified into a Deep Depression on the following day. Skirting off the Andaman and Nicobar Islands as a Deep Depression, BOB 06 was upgraded to a Cyclonic Storm by the IMD and JTWC, in the early hours of 8 December, and was assigned the name Vardah.

With conditions favorable for further development, Vardah intensified into a Severe Cyclonic Storm on 9 December. Although predicted to maintain its intensity, Vardah strengthened further, as it followed a generally west-northwestwards track, prompting the IMD to upgrade its intensity to Very Severe Cyclonic Storm status, on 10 December.

Afterward, it rapidly weakened into a depression, due to land interaction, on 13 December. The depression caused overnight rainfall in Southern Karnataka on 13 December. Due to land interaction, Vardah degenerated into a well-marked low on 13 December, at around midday, local time. The remnants of Vardah crossed the Indian Subcontinent and entered the Arabian Sea on 14 December. Owing to warm sea surface temperatures, the system regenerated into a depression on 17 December, with the IMD assigning the storm a new identifier, ARB 02, according to their protocol. On the next day, the system entered an area marked by colder sea surface temperatures and high wind shear, causing it to rapidly weaken into a well-marked low-pressure area on 18 December, just off the coast of Somalia, before moving ashore and dissipating on 19 December.

Preparations and impact

Thailand
The precursor low of Cyclone Vardah caused severe flooding in Thailand, affecting half a million residents in the country's southern provinces.

South India

Andaman and Nicobar Islands
Vardah brought heavy rainfall to Andaman and Nicobar Islands as a Deep Depression. Hut Bay recorded  of rainfall on 6 December, while Port Blair recorded  of rainfall on 7 December. More than 1,400 tourists were stranded on the Havelock and Neil islands of the archipelago, during the storm. They were evacuated by the Indian Navy on 9 December.

Tamil Nadu

More than 12,26,000 people were evacuated from low-lying areas, as a result of Vardah. The Indian Armed Forces were kept on standby for any relief operations. Two warships, INS Shivalik and INS Kadmatt, sailed out of Visakhapatnam to Chennai, carrying medical teams, divers, inflatable rubber boats, an integral helicopter, and material, including food, tents, clothes, medicines, and blankets to aid with relief efforts. Fifteen teams of the National Disaster Response Force were deployed in various coastal regions. The cyclone killed 24 people in the state, and caused ₹22,573 crore (US$3.35 billion) in damage.

Vardah crossed the eastern coast of India close to Chennai in the afternoon hours of 12 December 2016. Winds were estimated at  during landfall. The cyclone claimed over 18 lives, uprooted about 15 lakh trees in Chennai and its suburbs, and caused extensive damage to roads, supplies, and power infrastructure: over 1,00,000 electric poles were mangled and 8,000 transformers damaged. Carcasses of around 550 cows were found afloat in a lake in the Kancheepuram District. As many as 2,424 roads were blocked, and 240 huts were also damaged. More than ten people were reported to have been killed, due to events related to the storm.

Public transportation was severely affected by Vardah. Chennai International Airport was closed at least until 11:00 pm IST (5:30 pm UTC) on 12 December, in the wake of the storm, leaving about 5,000 passengers stranded. The Indian Railways suspended operations of all 170 outstation trains originating from Chennai, and suburban railway services were also cancelled. Chennai Metro services were also affected, after power was cut off, as a precaution by the EB.

Several Compound walls of buildings,  the glass windows of scrapers and certain buildings were damaged. If not,  the walls became weak.

Andhra Pradesh
Two people were killed in the state. And the cyclone brought heavy rainfall over Rayalaseema region and adjoining Nellore and Prakasam districts. The flooding were also minor with little damages to agricultural crops and livelihood.

See also

Cyclone Jal
Cyclone Mora
Cyclone Thane
Tropical Depression Wilma (2013)

References

External links

RSMC New Delhi

2016 North Indian Ocean cyclone season
Tropical cyclones in India
Tropical cyclones in Sri Lanka
2016 disasters in India
2016 in Sri Lanka
Very severe cyclonic storms
Tropical cyclones in 2016